The Peugeot Type 30 is an early motor vehicle produced between 1900 and 1902 by the French auto-maker Peugeot at their Audincourt plant. 84 were produced.

The vehicle was powered by a rear-mounted four-stroke engine, manufactured by Peugeot themselves. The engine's two cylinders were mounted in parallel and not in the V-format used for the company's first petrol-engined vehicle. The engine was mounted behind the driver and his (or, at least in principle, her) passenger above the rear axle.

The car was in effect an open-topped development of the manufacturer’s Type 21, introduced two years earlier.

Sources and further reading 
 Wolfgang Schmarbeck: Alle Peugeot Automobile 1890–1990. Motorbuch-Verlag. Stuttgart 1990. 

Type 30
Cars introduced in 1900
Veteran vehicles
1900s cars
Rear-engined vehicles